Francisco Villota y Baquiola (18 November 1873 – 7 January 1950) was a Spanish  (player of Basque pelota) who competed at the 1900 Summer Olympics in Paris, France.

Villota competed in the only official pelota contest in Olympic history, the Basque pelota at the 1900 Summer Olympics two-man teams event. He and his partner José de Amézola y Aspizúa were given the silver medal (equivalent nowadays to the gold medal) after achieving the first place without having to play, since the only other contestants, the French team, Maurice Durquetty and Etchegaray, withdrew due to a disagreement about the rules. This was Spain's first ever Olympic Medal.

References

Sources
 De Wael, Herman. Herman's Full Olympians: "Pelota 1900". Accessed 25 February 2006.
 
 "El primer medallista olímpico español ya tiene rostro y nombre" 
 

Pelotaris at the 1900 Summer Olympics
Olympic pelotaris of Spain
Olympic gold medalists for Spain
Spanish pelotaris
1873 births
1950 deaths
Medalists at the 1900 Summer Olympics
Sportspeople from Madrid